Lovers Are Never Losers is a 1929 novel by the French writer Jean Giono. It tells a love story set in rural France in the early 20th century. It is the standalone second entry in Giono's Pan trilogy; it was preceded by Colline and followed by Second Harvest. It was published in English in 1931, translated by Jacques Le Clercq.

Adaptation
The novel was the basis for the 1934 French film Angèle. The film was directed by Marcel Pagnol and stars Orane Demazis, Fernandel and Henri Poupon. A Turkish adaptation directed by Ömer Lütfi Akad was released in 1957 as Kara Talih.

References

1929 French novels
French novels adapted into films
French-language novels
Novels by Jean Giono
Éditions Grasset books